Jules-Clément Chaplain (12 July 1839 – 13 July 1909) was a French sculptor and one of its finest medallists. With Louis Oscar Roty (1846–1911) he helped found the Art Nouveau movement.

Chaplain was born in Mortagne-au-Perche, Orne, and in 1857 entered the École des Beaux-Arts where he studied sculpture under François Jouffroy and medals under Eugène Oudiné. In 1863 he won the Prix de Rome for medal-engraving and worked in Rome 1864–1868. He exhibited regularly at the Salon from 1863, receiving numerous awards, and in 1869 returned to Paris where he found official success almost immediately. In 1877 he was named official medallist of the French government, in 1878 a chevalier of the Légion d'honneur, and in 1881 appointed to the Académie des Beaux-Arts. In 1896 he became Art Director of the Manufacture nationale de Sèvres in 1900 a Commander of the Légion d'honneur.

Chaplain was responsible for the official portraits of every president of the French Republic from Patrice de Mac-Mahon, duc de Magenta, in 1877 to Émile Loubet in 1899. He also received the commission for engraving the gold coinage of France, and his official gold medal commemorating the 1896 visit of Czar Nicholas II of Russia was called "a masterpiece and one of the finest ever struck."

References 
 Answers.com entry
 Medaillen von Pomeki (in German)
 Objects by Jules-Clément Chaplain
 FineMedals.com photographs

External links
 
 Jules Clément Chaplain in: World of coins, retrieved 12 October 2013
 

1839 births
1909 deaths
People from Mortagne-au-Perche
19th-century French sculptors
French male sculptors
20th-century French sculptors
20th-century French male artists
French medallists
Prix de Rome for engraving
Art Nouveau sculptors
Art Nouveau medallists
Commandeurs of the Légion d'honneur
20th-century French printmakers
19th-century French male artists